Sims is a ghost town in Brazos County, in the U.S. state of Texas. It is located within the Bryan-College Station metropolitan area.

History
Sims was a station on the Texas and New Orleans Railroad in the early 1900s. It had several scattered houses in 1949. The community only consisted of empty corn, oil and cotton fields in 1990.

Geography

Education
Sims had its own school in the early 1900s and had two in 1949. Today, Sims is located within the Bryan Independent School District.

References

Ghost towns in Texas